Bulbophyllum lobbii (Lobb's bulbophyllum) is a species of orchid, also known as Thailand bulbophyllum or Sumatran bulbophyllum. It was named for the plant hunter Thomas Lobb, who introduced it to England from Java in 1846.

lobbii